Morna may refer to:

Morna (music), a genre of Cape Verdean music
Morna, Estonia, a village in Estonia
Morna, the fictional Estonian town, where the Estonian TV series Õnne 13 takes place
Morna, a synonym for the plant genus Waitzia
Morna (band), a band from Slovakia

People 
Morna Hooker, British theologian
Morna Anne Murray, Canadian singer